Anamul Haque is a former Bangladeshi footballer who played as a midfielder. He last played for Sheikh Jamal Dhanmondi Club and was the teams captain.

References

1985 births
Living people
Bangladeshi footballers
Bangladesh international footballers
Bangladesh youth international footballers
People from Comilla District
Mohammedan SC (Dhaka) players
Sheikh Russel KC players
Sheikh Jamal Dhanmondi Club players
Association football midfielders
Footballers at the 2006 Asian Games
Asian Games competitors for Bangladesh